Kool Keith Presents Thee Undatakerz is the only studio album by American horrorcore group Thee Undatakerz. It was released on May 11, 2004, via Activate Entertainment and was produced by the group's founder, Kool Keith, as well as Havoc Razor and Money D. The album was released in CS2CD format meaning it played both CD audio and DVD video. The album featured one single release, "Party in tha Morgue", which was featured in Blade: Trinity (soundtrack) in remixed form. Neither the single nor the album made it to any major charts.

Track listing

References

External links

2004 debut albums
Kool Keith albums
Horrorcore albums